Arden Lee Bement Jr. (born May 22, 1932) is an American engineer and scientist and has served in executive positions in government, industry and academia.

Bement was elected a member of the National Academy of Engineering in 1983 for contributions to the understanding of irradiation effects in nuclear materials and development of advanced materials concepts for defense applications.

He is a former Deputy Undersecretary of Defense for Research and Advanced Technology, Chief Technical Officer of TRW, Director of the National Science Foundation (NSF) and Director of the National Institute of Standards and Technology (NIST).  Following the end of his six-year term at NSF, on June 1, 2010 he became the founding director of the Global Policy Research Institute and Chief Global Affairs officer at Purdue University.

Biography
Born in Pittsburgh, Pennsylvania, Bement started his career at Climax Molybdenum Mine after graduating from high school. His supervisor, Prentice Cain, was a graduate of the Colorado School of Mines. He encouraged Arden to go to Mines, in fact, he helped Arden fill out the admission form, and then made a life-changing covenant. He agreed to put up the first semester’s tuition and if Arden made it beyond the first semester, he wouldn't owe him a dime.  Unfortunately,  Prentice Cain died before he could see Arden graduate but his unselfish contribution forever changed the career path and subsequent Science and Engineering contributions from Dr. Arden Bement.

Dr. Bement holds an engineer of metallurgy degree from the Colorado School of Mines, a master's degree in metallurgical engineering from the University of Idaho, a doctorate in metallurgical engineering from the University of Michigan, and honorary doctorates from Cleveland State University, Case Western Reserve University, Colorado School of Mines, Korean Advanced Institute of Science and Technology, University of Idaho, University of Macau, and the Michigan Technological University. He is a member of the National Academy of Engineering, a fellow of the American Academy of Arts and Sciences and a fellow of the American Association for the Advancement of Science. Bement is also a retired lieutenant colonel of the United States Army Corps of Engineers.

Dr. Bement served as a member of the U.S. National Commission for UNESCO and as the vice-chair of the Commission's Natural Sciences and Engineering Committee. He has served on and has chaired numerous NRC studies, most relevant to this study chairing the Committee on the Scientific and Technical Assessment of Stockpile Stewardship.  He has served as the head of the NIST Visiting Committee on Advanced Technology, head of the advisory committee for NIST’s Advanced Technology Program and as a member of the board of overseers for the Malcolm Baldrige National Quality Award. He chaired the Commission for Engineering and Technical Studies and the National Materials Advisory Board of the National Research Council, was a member of the Space Station Utilization Advisory Subcommittee and the Commercialization and Technology Advisory Committee for NASA and was a member of the U.S. National Science Board from 1989-1995, which guides NSF activities and serves as a policy advisory body to the President and Congress.

Dr. Bement has been a director of Keithley Instruments Inc., Lord Corporation, Midwest Superconductivity Consortium and the Consortium for the Intelligent Management of the Electrical Power Grid and as a member of the Science and Technology Advisory Committee, Howmet Corporation, a division of Alcoa.  He has been an advisor for The Electric Power Research Institute, the Department of Energy’s Argonne National Laboratory, Oak Ridge National Laboratory, Lawrence Livermore National Laboratory, Los Alamos National Laboratory, Sandia National Laboratory, and the Idaho National Engineering and Environmental Laboratory.  He is currently serving on the Science Advisory Council of the Skolkovo Foundation, the Board of Trustees of the Skolkovo Institute of Science and Technology, the Board of Visitors of the National Intelligence University, the Board of Trustees of Radian Research Inc., and President of the Indiana Academy of Science.
 
 1954-1965, General Electric Company: Sr. Research Associate
 1965-1970, Battelle Northwest Laboratories: Manager of Fuels, Materials, Metallurgy
 1970-1976, Massachusetts Institute of Technology: Professor of Nuclear Materials
 1976-1979, Defense Advanced Research Projects Agency: Director, Office of Materials Science
 1979-1980, United States Department of Defense: Deputy Undersecretary for Research and Engineering
 1980-1992, TRW: Vice President of Technical Resources and of Science and Technology
 1992-2001, Purdue University: Distinguished Professor of Nuclear Engineering, Materials, Electrical, Computer Engineering
 1992-2001, Purdue University: Head of the Schools of Nuclear Engineering, Appointment to Krannert School of Management
 2001-2004, NIST: Director of the National Institute of Standards and Acting Director of NSF from February–November 2004
 2004-2010, NSF: Director of the National Science Foundation
 2010-2012, Purdue University:  Inaugural Director of Purdue University's Global Policy Research Institute
 2010-2012, Purdue University:  Chief Global Affairs Officer for Purdue University
 2012-      Purdue University:  Professor Emeritus and Adjunct Professor, Department of Technology Leadership and Innovation, College of Technology

Awards and honors
Distinguished Service Medal of the Department of Defense (1980)
Member of the National Academy of Engineering (1983)
Member of the Cosmos Club (1980)
Distinguished Achievement Award from the Colorado School of Mines (1984)
Fellow of the American Academy of Arts and Sciences (2004)
Order of the Rising Sun, Gold and Silver Star awarded by the Emperor of Japan (2009)
Navigator Award awarded by Potomac Institute for Policy Study (2010)
Legion of Honor with the rank of Chevalier from the French Republic (2011)
Chinese Academy of Sciences Graduate School Honorary Professorship (2011)

See also
 List of directors of the National Institute of Standards and Technology

Notes

External links
Biography on the NSF website
Press release about Purdue GPRI appointment

1932 births
American nuclear engineers
Colorado School of Mines alumni
Fellows of the American Academy of Arts and Sciences
Living people
MIT School of Engineering faculty
Members of the United States National Academy of Engineering
Scientists from Pittsburgh
Purdue University faculty
Recipients of the Order of the Rising Sun, 2nd class
University of Idaho alumni
University of Michigan College of Engineering alumni
NIST Directors
Sandia National Laboratories people
United States National Science Foundation officials
Engineers from Pennsylvania
Obama administration personnel
George W. Bush administration personnel